Slovakia competed at the 2002 Winter Paralympics in Salt Lake City, United States. 14 competitors from Slovakia won 9 medals, 3 silver and 6 bronze and finished 20th in the medal table.

Medalists

See also 
 Slovakia at the Paralympics
 Slovakia at the 2002 Winter Olympics

References 

Slovakia at the Paralympics
2002 in Slovak sport
Nations at the 2002 Winter Paralympics